Revolution is the eighth studio album by the German metal band Crematory, distributed through Nuclear Blast, and the first release after the band's three year dissolution.

Track listing

Personnel 
Felix – vocals
Matthias Hechler – guitars, vocals
Katrin Jüllich – keyboards, layout
Harald Heine – bass
Markus Jüllich – drums, programming, producer, mixing, mastering

Additional personnel 
Hady Müller – photography
Kristian Kohlmannslehner – engineering
Jürgen "Luski" Lusky – mastering
Gerhard Magin – mixing
Raimond Neck – cover art

References 

2004 albums
Crematory (band) albums